Salander is a surname. Notable people with the surname include:

Corinna Salander (born 1967) is a German physicist and engineer
Lawrence Salander (born 1949), American art dealer and artist
Marie Salander (born 1985), Swedish footballer
Sven Salander (1894–1965), Swedish Army lieutenant general

Fictional characters
Lisbeth Salander, a character in the Millennium series by Stieg Larsson